Zagreus is a god in Greek religion and mythology.

Zagreus may also refer to:
 Zagreus (audio drama), based on the British television series Doctor Who
 Zagreus, the protagonist of the video game Hades